Four runs may refer to:

In cricket, four runs are scored when the ball touches the boundary or the ground beyond it after bouncing in the field
In baseball, four runs is the maximum number of runs that can be scored in a single play, via a grand slam home run